Ásta María Reynisdóttir (born 23 February 1962) is an Icelandic former footballer who was a member of Iceland's ignaural national team in 1981. She was a key player for Breiðablik for almost two decades, winning 8 national championships and 3 Icelandic Cups from 1977 to 1995.

Honours
 Icelandic championship
 1977, 1979, 1980, 1981, 1982, 1983, 1990, 1995
 Icelandic Cup
 1981, 1982, 1983

Personal life
Ásta María was born to Reynir Karlsson, the former manager of the Icelandic men's national football team, and Svanfríður Guðjónsdóttir, the first woman to be a member of the board of Football Association of Iceland. Her brother, Guðjón Karl Reynisson, played football for Breiðablik men's team and later managed the women's team.

References

External links
 
 Profile on blikar.is

1962 births
Living people
Asta Maria Reynisdottir
Asta Maria Reynisdottir
Asta Maria Reynisdottir
Asta Maria Reynisdottir
Women's association footballers not categorized by position